Mosti or MOSTI may refer to:

 Donji Mosti, a village in Croatia
 Ondina mosti, a species of sea snail
 Portrait of Vincenzo Mosti, a painting by Titian
 Ministry of Science, Technology and Innovation (Malaysia)

People
 Luca Mosti (born 1998), Italian footballer
 Nicola Mosti (born 1998), Italian footballer

See also
 Mostis, king of the Caeni c. 130 BC-c. 90 BC
 Mosty (disambiguation)